eSpeak is a free and open-source, cross-platform, compact, software speech synthesizer. It uses a formant synthesis method, providing many languages in a relatively small file size. eSpeakNG (Next Generation) is a continuation of the original developer's project with more feedback from native speakers.

Because of its small size and many languages, eSpeakNG is included in NVDA open source screen reader for Windows, as well as Android, Ubuntu and other Linux distributions. Its predecessor eSpeak was recommended by Microsoft in 2016 and was used by Google Translate for 27 languages in 2010; 17 of these were subsequently replaced by proprietary voices.

The quality of the language voices varies greatly. In eSpeakNG's predecessor eSpeak, the initial versions of some languages were based on information found on Wikipedia. Some languages have had more work or feedback from native speakers than others. Most of the people who have helped to improve the various languages are blind users of text-to-speech.

History 

In 1995, Jonathan Duddington released the Speak speech synthesizer for RISC OS computers supporting British English. On 17 February 2006, Speak 1.05 was released under the GPLv2 license, initially for Linux, with a Windows SAPI 5 version added in January 2007. Development on Speak continued until version 1.14, when it was renamed to eSpeak.

Development of eSpeak continued from 1.16 (there was not a 1.15 release) with the addition of an eSpeakEdit program for editing and building the eSpeak voice data. These were only available as separate source and binary downloads up to eSpeak 1.24. The 1.24.02 version of eSpeak was the first version of eSpeak to be version controlled using subversion, with separate source and binary downloads made available on SourceForge. From eSpeak 1.27, eSpeak was updated to use the GPLv3 license. The last official eSpeak release was 1.48.04 for Windows and Linux, 1.47.06 for RISC OS and 1.45.04 for macOS. The last development release of eSpeak was 1.48.15 on 16 April 2015.

eSpeak uses the Usenet scheme to represent phonemes with ASCII characters.

eSpeak NG 
On 25 June 2010, Reece Dunn started a fork of eSpeak on GitHub using the 1.43.46 release. This started off as an effort to make it easier to build eSpeak on Linux and other POSIX platforms.

On 4 October 2015 (6 months after the 1.48.15 release of eSpeak), this fork started diverging more significantly from the original eSpeak.

On 8 December 2015, there were discussions on the eSpeak mailing list about the lack of activity from Jonathan Duddington over the previous 8 months from the last eSpeak development release. This evolved into discussions of continuing development of eSpeak in Jonathan's absence. The result of this was the creation of the espeak-ng (Next Generation) fork, using the GitHub version of eSpeak as the basis for future development.

On 11 December 2015, the espeak-ng fork was started. The first release of espeak-ng was 1.49.0 on 10 September 2016, containing significant code cleanup, bug fixes, and language updates.

Features 
eSpeakNG can be used as a command-line program, or as a shared library.

It supports Speech Synthesis Markup Language (SSML).

Language voices are identified by the language's ISO 639-1 code. They can be modified by "voice variants". These are text files which can change characteristics such as pitch range, add effects such as echo, whisper and croaky voice, or make systematic adjustments to formant frequencies to change the sound of the voice. For example, "af" is the Afrikaans voice. "af+f2" is the Afrikaans voice modified with the "f2" voice variant which changes the formants and the pitch range to give a female sound.

eSpeakNG uses an ASCII representation of phoneme names which is loosely based on the Usenet system.

Phonetic representations can be included within text input by including them within double square-brackets. For example: espeak-ng -v en "Hello [[w3:ld]]" will say  in English.

Synthesis method 

eSpeakNG can be used as text-to-speech translator in different ways, depending on which text-to-speech translation step user want to use.

1. step — text to phoneme translation 
There are many languages (notably English) which don't have straightforward one-to-one rules between writing and pronunciation; therefore, the first step in text-to-speech generation has to be text-to-phoneme translation.

input text is translated into pronunciation phonemes (e.g. input text xerox is translated into  for pronunciation). 
pronunciation phonemes are synthesized into sound e.g.,  is voiced as 

To add intonation for speech i.e. prosody data are necessary (e.g. stress of syllable, falling or rising pitch of basic frequency, pause, etc.) and other information, which allows to synthesize more human, non-monotonous speech. E.g. in eSpeakNG format stressed syllable is added using apostrophe:  which provides more natural speech: 

For comparison two samples with and without prosody data:
 is spelled 
 is spelled 

If eSpeakNG is used for generation of prosody data only, then prosody data can be used as input for MBROLA diphone voices.

2. step — sound synthesis from prosody data 
The eSpeakNG provides two different types of formant speech synthesis using its two different approaches. With its own eSpeakNG synthesizer and a Klatt synthesizer:

The eSpeakNG synthesizer creates voiced speech sounds such as vowels and sonorant consonants by additive synthesis adding together sine waves to make the total sound. Unvoiced consonants e.g. /s/ are made by playing recorded sounds, because they are rich in harmonics, which makes additive synthesis less effective. Voiced consonants such as /z/ are made by mixing a synthesized voiced sound with a recorded sample of unvoiced sound.
The Klatt synthesizer mostly uses the same formant data as the eSpeakNG synthesizer. But, it also produces sounds by subtractive synthesis by starting with generated noise, which is rich in harmonics, and then applying digital filters and enveloping to filter out necessary frequency spectrum and sound envelope for particular consonant (s, t, k) or sonorant (l, m, n) sound.

For the MBROLA voices, eSpeakNG converts the text to phonemes and associated pitch contours. It passes this to the MBROLA program using the PHO file format, capturing the audio created in output by MBROLA. That audio is then handled by eSpeakNG.

Languages 
eSpeakNG performs text-to-speech synthesis for the following languages:

Abaza
Abenaki
Achinese
Adyghe
Afar
Afrikaans
Albanian
Amharic
Apache
Arabela
Ancient Greek
Arabic1
Aragonese
Arapaho
Armenian (Eastern Armenian)
Armenian (Western Armenian)
Aromanian	
Assamese
Assiniboine
Avaric
Awadhi
Aymara
Azerbaijani
Bashkir
Basque
Basic English
Belarusian
Bengali
Bhojpuri
Bicolano
Bodo
Bishnupriya Manipuri
Bosnian
Bulgarian
Breton
Burmese
Caddo
Cahuilla
Cantonese
Carrier
Catalan
Catawba
Cayuga
Cebuano
Chamorro
Chechen
Cherokee
Cheyenne
Chhattisgarhi
Chichewa
Chickasaw
Chinese (Mandarin)
Chipewyan
Chippewa
Chitonga
Chittagonian
Choctaw
Conestoga
Corsican
Croatian
Crow
Czech
Chuvash
Church Slavonic
Crimean Tatar
Dakota
Danish
Dari
Divehi
Dogri
Dogrib
Dutch
Dzongkha
Edo
English (American)
English (British)
English (Caribbean)
English (Lancastrian)
English (Received Pronunciation)
English (Scottish)
English (West Midlands)
Esperanto
Estonian
Ewe
Eyak
Finnish
Filipino
Fon
Fox
French (Belgian)
French (Canada)
French (France)
French (Swiss)
Frisian
Gagauz
Galician
Garhwali
Garifuna
Garo
Georgian
German
Greek (Modern)
Greenlandic
Guarani
Gujarati
Gwichin
Haida
Haisla
Hakka Chinese3
Haitian Creole
Hän
Haryanvi
Hausa
Hawaiian
Hebrew
Hidatsa
High Valyrian
Hiligaynon
Hindi
Hmong
Ho-Chunk
Hopi
Hungarian
Hunsrik
Iban
Ibibio
Icelandic
Igbo
Iloko
Indonesian
Ido
Interlingua
Interlingue
Irish
Italian
Japanese4
Javanese
Judaeo-Spanish
Kannada
Kansa
Kashmiri
Kazakh
Khakas
Khmer
Klingon
Kʼicheʼ
Kirundi
Kikuyu
Kinyarwanda
Konkani
Korean
Krio
Kumyk
Kurdish
Kyrgyz
Quechua
Ladakhi
Lakota
Lao
Latin
Latgalian
Latvian
Lang Belta
Lingua Franca Nova
Lepcha
Lezgi
Limbu
Limburgish
Lingala
Lithuanian
Lojban
Luganda
Luxembourgish
Macedonian
Madurese
Magahi
Maithili
Makassarese
Malagasy
Malay
Malayalam
Maltese
Mandan
Manipuri
Māori
Marathi
Mohawk
Moldovan
Mon
Mongolian
Nahuatl (Classical)
Navajo
Nepali
Norwegian (Bokmål)
Northern Sotho
Novial
Nogai
Old English
Odia
Omaha-Ponca
Oneida
Onondaga
Oromo
Occitan
Papiamento
Palauan
Pashto
Pawnee
Persian
Persian (Latin alphabet)2
Polish
Portuguese (Brazilian)
Portuguese (Portugal)
Punjabi
Pyash (a constructed language)
Quapaw
Romanian
Raramuri
Russian
Russian (Latvia)
Sadri
Salar
Samoan
Sanskrit
Santali
Scottish Gaelic
Seneca
Serbian
Shan (Tai Yai)
Sharda
Sesotho
Shipibo
Shona
Sindhi
Sinhala
Slovak
Slovenian
Somali
Spanish (Spain)
Spanish (Latin American)
Spanish (United States)
Stoney
Sundanese
Swahili
Swedish
Sylheti
Tajik
Tamil
Tatar
Tetum
Telugu
Tibetan
Tswana
Thai
Tuvan
Turkmen
Turkish
Tatar
Uyghur
Ukrainian
Urarina
Urdu
Uzbek
Vietnamese (Central Vietnamese)
Vietnamese (Northern Vietnamese)
Vietnamese (Southern Vietnamese)
Volapük
Wayuu
Welsh
Wolof
Xavante
Xhosa
Yiddish
Yoruba
Yucateco
Zulu
Zuni

Currently, only fully diacritized Arabic is supported.
Persian written using English (Latin) characters.
Currently, only Pha̍k-fa-sṳ is supported.
Currently, only Hiragana and Katakana are supported.

See also 

Festival Speech Synthesis System
PlainTalk
Google Translate
Microsoft text-to-speech voices
Speech

References

External links 
eSpeakNG on GitHub
eSpeakNG mailing list
eSpeak ported to JavaScript
Testing page for eSpeakNG development version
Tombuntu magazine article about eSpeak
GUI for eSpeak
Ruby API for eSpeak
Lua API for eSpeak
eCantorix singing synthesis frontend for eSpeak

Free software programmed in C
Free speech synthesis software
GNOME Accessibility
Open source software synthesizers